The Frying Pan Meetinghouse (also known as Frying Pan Old School Baptist Church (1832) or Frying Pan Spring Meeting House) is a historic church building within Frying Pan Farm Park in Floris, Virginia.

It was built in 1791 as a church building. In 1984 the last remaining trustee deeded the building to the Fairfax County Park Authority to preserve and maintain the property. The building and cemetery were added to the National Register of Historic Places in 1991.

See also
Floris Historic District, nearby, NRHP-listed, containing Frying Pan Farm Park

References

Churches completed in 1791
Baptist churches in Virginia
Churches on the National Register of Historic Places in Virginia
Churches in Fairfax County, Virginia
National Register of Historic Places in Fairfax County, Virginia
18th-century churches in the United States